Pathira Vasan Dushmantha Chameera (born 11 January 1992) is a professional Sri Lankan cricketer who plays for all three formats for the national team, and plays domestically for Nondescripts Cricket Club. He made his international debut for Sri Lanka in January 2015.

Domestic and T20 franchise career
In March 2018, Chameera was named in Colombo's squad for the 2017–18 Super Four Provincial Tournament. The following month, he was also named in Colombo's squad for the 2018 Super Provincial One Day Tournament.

In August 2018, Chameera was named in Galle's squad the 2018 SLC T20 League. In March 2019, he was named in Galle's squad for the 2019 Super Provincial One Day Tournament. In October 2020, he was drafted by the Colombo Kings for the inaugural edition of the Lanka Premier League. In January 2018, he was bought by the Rajasthan Royals in the 2018 IPL auction. However, he missed the first weeks of the tournament with a back injury.

In August 2021, Chameera was included in the Royal Challengers Bangalore squad for the second phase of the 2021 Indian Premier League (IPL) in the UAE. In November 2021, he was selected to play for the Colombo Stars following the players' draft for the 2021 Lanka Premier League.

In February 2022, he was bought by the Lucknow Super Giants in the auction for the 2022 Indian Premier League tournament. In July 2022, he was signed by the Galle Gladiators for the third edition of the Lanka Premier League.

International career
A right-arm fast bowler, Chameera made his ODI debut for Sri Lanka against New Zealand on 29 January 2015. He took his first international wicket in his first over when he bowled Ross Taylor, and he also dismissed Grant Elliott, with Sri Lanka winning the match.

Chameera was selected to the 2015 ICC Cricket World Cup, but did not take part in first few matches. He was picked for the squad against Sri Lanka's last pool A match against Scotland, where he took 3 wickets for 51 runs. Sri Lanka went on to win the match.

Chameera made his Test debut against Pakistan in June 2015. He received the 129th Test cap for Sri Lanka. He took his first Test wicket when he bowled Zulfiqar Babar for 5 runs. In the second innings of the same match, he guided Sri Lanka to the win by taking three wickets finishing with figures of 4/76 in 28.5 overs in both innings. He suffered a side-strain in the match and was ruled out of the third Test of the series. He made his Twenty20 International debut for Sri Lanka against the West Indies on 9 November 2015.

In May 2018, Chameera was one of 33 cricketers to be awarded a national contract by Sri Lanka Cricket ahead of the 2018–19 season. In May 2021, in the third match against Bangladesh, Chameera took his first five-wicket haul in an ODI match and he was also the man of the match in the same match. In the third ODI against South Africa on 7 September 2021, Chameera made an impressive match winning opening bowling performance. Finally, Sri Lanka won by 78 runs and Chameera adjudged man of the match as well. Later the same month, Chameera was named in Sri Lanka's squad for the 2021 ICC Men's T20 World Cup. His no-ball in a game against Australia in the T20 World Cup was described by the press as "a contender for one of the worst deliveries of all-time", "worst ball bowled", and "one of the filthiest balls you will ever witness".

Achievements
In the annual ICC Awards in January 2022, Chameera was included in ICC Men's ODI Team of the Year for the year 2021.

References

External links
 
 

1992 births
Living people
Sri Lankan cricketers
Sri Lanka Test cricketers
Sri Lanka One Day International cricketers
Sri Lanka Twenty20 International cricketers
Cricketers at the 2015 Cricket World Cup
Nondescripts Cricket Club cricketers
Nagenahira Nagas cricketers
Wayamba cricketers
People from Ragama
Galle Guardians cricketers
Colombo Stars cricketers
Lucknow Super Giants cricketers